Mujaahid Toffar (born 12 September 1998) is a South African cricketer. He made his first-class debut for Western Province in the 2018–19 CSA 3-Day Provincial Cup on 21 February 2019.

References

External links
 

1998 births
Living people
South African cricketers
Western Province cricketers
Place of birth missing (living people)